Sublette is a locale in Weld County, Colorado.

References

}

Geography of Weld County, Colorado
Geography of Colorado